Sydney is Australia's most populous city, and is also the most populous city in Oceania. In the 2021 census, 5,231,147 persons declared themselves as residents of the Sydney Statistical Division–about one-fifth (20.58%) of Australia's total population.  With a population density of 2037 people per square kilometre, the urban core has population density five times that of the greater region.

Sydney is the most densely populated city in Australia and is also the busiest city in Australia. The median age of Sydney residents was 37 years, and households comprised an average of 2.7 members.

History 

European settlement in Sydney began in 1788, and in 1800 Sydney had around 3,000 non-indigenous inhabitants. It took time for the city's population to grow–in 1851 its population was only 39,000, compared with 77,000 in Melbourne. The subsequent gold rushes in Victoria caused the population of Melbourne to increase rapidly, while the lesser gold rushes in New South Wales had a less profound effect on the population of Sydney.

Sydney overtook Melbourne as Australia's most populous city in the early twentieth century, and reached the million inhabitants milestone around 1925. The opening of the Sydney Harbour Bridge helped pave the way for further urban development north of Sydney Harbour. Post-war immigration and a baby boom helped the population reach 2 million by 1962. Sydney remained Australia's most populous city throughout the 20th century, and is projected to retain this position for much of the 21st century.

At the August 2021 Australian census, Sydney's population reached 5 million people.

Density

Sydney is particularly noted for its low population density, due to its history. Surrounded by land that was considered unowned by the city's founders, early Sydney enjoyed relatively low land values. Coupled with successive governments' willingness to release new land on the city's outskirts for further development, this history has given Sydney a low-density self-image.

Multiculturalism 

Most immigrants to Sydney between 1840 and 1930 were British, Irish or Chinese. At the 2021 census, the most commonly nominated ancestries were:

At the 2021 census, there were 2,260,410 people living in Sydney that were born overseas, accounting for 43.2% of the population Sydney, above Vancouver (42.5%), Los Angeles (37.7%), New York City (37.5%), Chicago (20.7%), Paris (14.6%) and Berlin (13%). Only 31.0% of the population had both parents born in Australia. Sydney has the eighth-largest immigrant population among world metropolitan areas. Foreign countries of birth with the greatest representation are Mainland China, India, England, Vietnam and the Philippines.

42.0% of people in Sydney speak a language other than English at home with Mandarin (5.0%), Arabic (4.2%), Cantonese (2.8%), Vietnamese (2.2%) and Hindi (1.5%) the most widely spoken.

1.7% of the population, or 90,939 people, identified as Indigenous Australians (Aboriginal Australians and Torres Strait Islanders) in 2021.

Sydney has been a hub of a number of migrant communities, such as the Lebanese, Fijian, Korean and Nepalese. Well over half of Australia's 25,000-strong Nepalese community, for example, is concentrated in Sydney. Seven out of every ten Lebanese migrants in Australia live in Sydney. The Ghanaian community has been noted as being quite visible in Sydney, with the number of Ghanaian churches being unusually large considering the relatively small number of Ghanaians in Australia. Furthermore, the suburb of Fairfield in the Greater Western Sydney area, is an ethnic enclave of Assyrian Christians, where they are the largest ethnic group in the suburb and also in the surrounding areas of Fairfield Heights, Prairiewood and Greenfield Park. There is a Romani community in Sydney.

Religion 
At the 2006 Census, the most common responses for religion were Catholic (29.2%), Anglican (16.5%), Eastern Orthodox (4.8%) and Islam (4.4%). 14.1% declared no religious affiliation. 10.4% left the question blank, 3.7% were Buddhists, 1.7% were Hindu, 0.9% were Jewish.

The 2011 Census most common responses were Catholic, (28.3%), Anglican (14.7%), Islam (5.3%) and Eastern Orthodox (4.6%). 17.5% declared no religion.

In 2016, the most common responses for religion in Greater Sydney were Catholic 25.1%, No Religion, so described 24.6%, Anglican 12.0%, Not stated 8.8% and Islam 5.3%.

In the 2021 Census, the most common religion responses were No Religion 30.3%, Catholic 23.1%, Anglican 9.2% and Islam 6.3%. 6.2% of people did not answer the question.

See also 

 Demographics of Australia
 Immigration to Australia
 List of population demographics of New South Wales by local government area

Notes

References 

Sydney
Sydney
Sydney